Ingram is an unincorporated community in Mendocino County, California, United States.

References

Unincorporated communities in California
Unincorporated communities in Mendocino County, California